Boss Tenors in Orbit! is a 1962 studio album by American jazz tenor saxophonists Sonny Stitt and Gene Ammons.

Reception
The Allmusic review by Michael G. Nastos awarded the album four and a half stars and wrote: "The soulful Ammons and the bop-oriented Stitt meshed well whether playing standards, jamming on familiar melodies, or in ballad form. While not an out-and-out knock-down, drag-out event like their other recordings, this is still one of too few magical efforts with Ammons and Stitt together. Those who crave the live cutting sessions that made jazz very exciting in the early '60s might also consider this tamer studio effort."

Track listing
 "Long Ago (and Far Away)" (Ira Gershwin, Jerome Kern) - 6:17
 "Walkin'" (Jimmy Mundy) - 5:21
 "Why Was I Born?" (Oscar Hammerstein II, Kern) - 8:20
 "John Brown's Body" (Traditional) - 7:22
 "Bye Bye Blackbird" (Mort Dixon, Ray Henderson) - 9:58

Personnel
Sonny Stitt - tenor saxophone
Gene Ammons - tenor saxophone
Don Patterson - organ
Paul Weeden - guitar
Billy James - drums

References

Verve Records albums
Sonny Stitt albums
Gene Ammons albums
1962 albums
Collaborative albums